"Not Me" is Amy Pearson's second single from her debut album Who I Am.

Not Me may also refer to:

Music
 Not Me (album), 1987 album by Glenn Medeiros
 "Not Me," a song by
 Gary U.S. Bonds, 1961
 The Orlons, 1962
 This Mortal Coil, 1984
 Lil Wayne, 2020

Other uses
 Not Me, an invisible gremlin who represents blame-shifting, in Bil and Jeff Keane's syndicated comic strip The Family Circus
 Not Me (TV series), 2021 Thai action drama

See also
 It's Not Me, It's You (disambiguation)
 She's Not Me (disambiguation)
 That's Not Me (disambiguation)
 Why Not Me (disambiguation)